William John Bartlett (5 September 1915 – 6 January 1967) was an Australian rules footballer who played with Geelong in the Victorian Football League (VFL).

His VFL football career overlapped with his period of service in the Australian Army in World War II, and he later served in the Royal Australian Air Force as well.

Notes

External links 

1915 births
1967 deaths
Australian rules footballers from Victoria (Australia)
Geelong Football Club players
Geelong West Football Club players
Australian Army personnel of World War II
Australian Army soldiers
Royal Australian Air Force personnel of World War II
Royal Australian Air Force airmen